Sundaram Ravi (born 22 April 1966) is an Indian cricket umpire from who was a member of the ICC Elite Panel of Umpires between 2015 and 2019. After making his Twenty20 International (T20I) debut in 2011, he officiated in over 100 international matches at Test, One Day International (ODI) and T20I level. 

He was elevated to the Elite Panel of ICC Umpires in 2015 and became the second Indian umpire after Srinivasaraghavan Venkataraghavan ever to be a member of the Elite panel. He was selected as one of the twenty umpires to stand in matches during the 2015 Cricket World Cup.

In April 2019, he was named as one of the sixteen umpires to stand in matches during the 2019 Cricket World Cup. In July 2019, he was removed from Elite Panel of Umpires. In October 2019, he was appointed as one of the twelve umpires to officiate matches in the 2019 ICC T20 World Cup Qualifier tournament in the United Arab Emirates.

See also
 List of Test cricket umpires
 List of One Day International cricket umpires
 List of Twenty20 International cricket umpires

References

1966 births
Living people
Indian cricket umpires
Indian Test cricket umpires
Indian One Day International cricket umpires
Indian Twenty20 International cricket umpires
Cricketers from Bangalore